St. Louis School, located in Sai Ying Pun (historically West Point, Hong Kong) is a privately run, Catholic primary and (government-subsidized) secondary English grammar school. There are currently about 800 secondary students and 350 primary school students.

History

Early history
During the 1840s, the present location of St. Louis School was the site of a small battery, called the West Point Battery or Elliot's Battery.

St. Louis School was founded in 1864 by the Fathers of the Catholic Mission; St Aloysius was chosen as the Patron of the school. The school was initially known as the West Point Reformatory. The Brothers of the Christian Schools (commonly known as the La Salle Brothers) succeeded the Fathers in the management of the school in 1875 and managed the school until 1893.

In 1921, Bishop Pozzoni, the Ordinary of Hong Kong, requested the Maryknoll Fathers to take over. Some of the boys were orphans while the rest were remanded by the Hong Kong government, the government giving a small monthly grant for each student. The Maryknoll Fathers renamed the school 'St Louis Industrial School' and equipped it with a printing press. The students became expert in this line and seven years later when the Paris Foreign Missions Society started their celebrated polyglot press at Nazareth in Pokfulam, they took into their employ many of these boys. When Brother Albert Staubli arrived, he added manual training to its curriculum in the way of carpentry. The American Maryknoller, Fr James Edward Walsh, who was one of the first four American missioners to arrive in China and the last Western missioner to be released by the Communist China in 1970, spent some time at the school too.

Early in 1926, Maryknoll's Father Superior and one of the co-founders, Fr James Anthony Walsh, made a visitation of his fledgling mission fields in South China and spent some weeks in Hong Kong before visiting Kongmoon (now called Jiangmen) and Kaying (in Meixian). In the course of his stay, the position of the industrial school was reviewed and it was eventually handed back to the Diocese.

Salesian Fathers
In 1927, the school was given to the Salesian Fathers and has been run by them since then. The year 1927 is now regarded as the founding year of today's school. The school was transformed from a vocational school to an English grammar school in 1948.

The primary section of St Louis School was particularly famous in the 1970s and the 1980s, for it won almost all the inter-school quiz competitions organized by Radio Television Hong Kong.

Facilities
The school consists of four wings: East, North, Central and West. The oldest one is the East Wing (Block A), which was built in 1936. The North Wing was damaged by a typhoon in 1942, and a new building was subsequently erected. The Central and West Wings were constructed and opened in 1941 and 1967 respectively.

The school's sports facilities include a football playground (with a stand for about 1,100 people), a basketball court and a covered playground. The football playground is the largest among those of all the schools in West Point.

School badge, motto, song
The badge of St Louis School embodies a profound philosophy through the simplicity of its design.

The white background symbolizes the innocence of the students.
The central red cross reminds the students to adopt Christ as their mentor, and to possess love and passion, a sense of self-sacrifice and full service.
The letters 'S' and 'L' are the initials of Saint Louis.
The two Greek letters Α (Alpha) and Ω (Omega) in the book on the cross exhort the students to pursue virginity.
The Latin phrase ' SCIENTIA ET PIETAS' at the bottom of the badge is the school motto, it means 'knowledge and piety'. It instructs the students to place equal emphases on both knowledge and piety.

The school song 'All Hail, All Hail' was written by Rev Fr Janssen in 1957.

Principals and Rectors
1927-1934: Fr Vincenzo Bernardini; 1st Rector and Principal
1934-1937: Fr Teodor Wieczorek; 2nd Rector and Principal
1937-1946: Fr John Guarona; 3rd Rector and Principal
1946-1949: Fr Pietro Pomat; 4th Rector and Principal
1949-1955: Fr John Clifford; 5th Rector and Principal
1955-1958: Fr Bernard Tohill; 6th Rector and Principal
1958-1964: Fr Lam Yum-ching; 7th Rector and Principal
1964-1970: Fr John Foster; 8th Rector and Principal
1970-1976: Fr Alexander Smith; 9th Rector and Principal
1976-1982: Fr Giuliano Carpella; 10th Rector and Principal 
1982-1988: Fr Luigi Rubini; 1st Supervisor 
1982-1986: Fr Patrick Deane; 11th Rector and Principal
1988-1994: Fr Clement Wong; 2nd Supervisor
1986-2016: Fr Simon Lam; 12th Principal; 3rd Supervisor 1994–2016
2000-2003: Fr Alphonsus Cheng; 14th Rector
2001-2002: Fr Joseph So; 13th Principal
2002-2012: Fr Peter Ng; 14th Principal
2012–2016: Dr Yip Wai-Ming; 15th Principal
2016–Present: Fr. Matthew CHAN Hung-Kee; 4th Supervisor 2016–present
2016-2021: Mr Peter Yu Lap-Fun, 16th Principal 
2021–Present: Dr. Victor Yick Ho-Kuen; 17th Principal (Incumbent)

Fathers and Brothers

FATHERS:
 Rev Fr. Anthony BOGADEK (鮑嘉天 神父) 1931 –
 Rev Fr. Giuliano CARPELLA (家思齊 神父) 1923 – 2006 
 Rev Fr. Matthew CHAN Hung-Kee (陳鴻基 神父) 1948 –
 Rev Fr. Alphonsus CHENG Tai-Kai (鄭泰祺 神父) 1945 - 
 Rev Fr. Joseph CHENG Hoi-Hong (鄭海康 神父) 1930 – 2007 
 Rev Fr. Elias CHU Wai-Yeng (朱偉英 神父) 1925 - 1990 
 Rev Fr. John Peter CLIFFORD (祁志堯 神父) 1911 - 2000  
 Rev Fr. Patrick DEANE (田惠民 神父) 1926 – 2007 
 Rev Fr. John FOSTER (科士德 神父) 1927 – 2017 
 Rev Fr. Attilio GALLO (勞明德 神父) 1920 – 2014 
 Rev Fr. Bruno GELOSA (伊思高 神父) 1914 – 2005 
 Rev Fr. John GUARONA (溫普仁 神父) 1889 – 1961 
 Rev Fr. HO, Ka-Fai (何家輝 神父)
 Rev Fr. Peter HO Kuong-Ling (何廣凌 神父) 1929 - 2014 
 Rev Fr. William JOYCE (曹文植 神父) 1918 – 2005 
 Rev Fr. Gerard KERKLAAN (顧達明 神父) 1921 - 2005) 
 Rev Fr. John LAM (林健漢 神父)
 Rev Fr. Simon LAM (林仲偉 神父) 1950 –
 Rev Fr. Joseph LEE Hei-Lung (李海龍 神父) 1928 -
 Rev Fr. Vincent LIANG Ding-Shiung (梁鼎勳 神父) 1926 - 2014 
 Rev Fr. Mathias LING (林蔭清 神父) 1922 - 2007
 Rev Fr. Stanislaus LOH Tat-Cho (陸達初 神父) 1929 – 2020 
 Rev Fr. Alexander MA Yiu-Hon (a.k.a. Alejandro Cervantes) (馬耀漢神父) 1919 – 2009 
 Rev Fr. Denis MARIN (華近禮 神父) 1921 - 2006 
 Rev Fr. Michael McKENNA (麥謹行 神父) 1938 –
 Rev Fr. Peter NEWBERY, BBS (李文列 神父) 1948 -
 Rev Fr. Peter NG (吳多祿 神父) 1958 -
 Rev Fr. Gaetano NICOSIA (胡子義 神父) 1915 – 2017 
 Rev Fr. Peter POMATI (武幼安 神父) 1906 – 1994 
 Rev Fr. Adrian RIEMSLAG (林兆良 神父) 1918 - 1999
 Rev Fr. Mario ROSSO (朱懷德 神父) 1924 - 2017 
 Rev Fr. Luigi RUBINI (魯炳義 神父) 1920 – 2009 
 Rev Fr. Pio SCILLIGO (石理覺 神父) 1928 – 2009
 Rev Fr. Alexander SMITH (施彌德 神父) 1915 – 2008  
 Rev Fr. Joseph SO (蘇志超 神父) 1948 – 
 Rev Fr. Michael SUPPO (蘇冠明 神父) 1902 – 1972 
 Rev Fr. John TANG Tsing-Tze (鄧青慈 神父) 1917 - 2005 
 Rev Fr. Anthony TCHEONG Chi-Shing (張志誠 神父) 1939 – 2022 
 Rev Fr. John TIMMERMANS (田永民 神父) 1916 – 1994  
 Rev Fr. Bernard TOHILL (杜希賢 神父) 1919 – 2010 
 Rev Fr. Peter TSANG (張錦泉 神父) 1928 – 2020 
 Rev Fr. Teodor WIECZOREK (韋助力 神父) 1888 - 1957 
 Rev Fr. Clement WONG (黃光照 神父) 1938 –
 Rev Fr. Francis WONG Kin-Kwok (黃建國 神父) 1941 - 2017  
 Rev Fr. Thomas YU Ping-Chiu (余秉昭 神父) 1921 - 2000 
BROTHERS:
 Bro Luigi BONNICI (封義士 修士) 1892 - 1958 
 Bro Joseph CHEUNG Koon-Wing (張冠榮 修士)  1946 - 
 Bro Thomas CHEUNG Yan-Hung (張恩洪 修士) 1925 - 2012 
 Bro Paolo DOLDI (杜國才 修士) 1904 - 1973 
 Bro Ottavio FANTINI (范德理 修士) 1892 - 1990 
 Bro Calo Domenico FINO (方榮廣 修士) 1905 - 1935 
 Bro Domenico FRANCESIA (馮英毅 修士) 1906 - 1991 
 Bro John JEZOVIT (易浩然 修士) 1909 - 1994 
 Bro Edward KOWALA (高懷黎 修士) 1926 - 2017 
 Bro John LEE (李北泉 修士) 1937 - 
 Bro Joseph LO Wing-Tak (盧榮德 修士) 1940 - 2014 
 Bro Marius LU Hua-Ching (陸華清 修士) 1928 - 2022  
 Bro John de REGGI (翟以理 修士) 1892 - 1990
 Bro Paul TANG (鄧保祿 修士) 1914 - 1941 
 Bro Peter YEH Jih-Chiu (葉際趨 修士) 1927 - 2013

Conservation
The East Wing of St. Louis School, built in 1936, is listed as a Grade II historic building, "Buildings of special merit; efforts should be made to selectively preserve". St. Louis School is part of the Central and Western Heritage Trail, Western District and the Peak Route.

References

Further reading
 Early History of St. Louis School (1863-1922)

External links

 St Louis School official website
 St Louis School (primary section) official website
 St Louis Old Boys' Association (Alumni Association)
 Pictures of the East Wing of St. Louis School

Educational institutions established in 1864
Catholic secondary schools in Hong Kong
Roman Catholic primary schools in Hong Kong
Salesian schools
Maryknoll schools
Secondary schools in Hong Kong
Grade II historic buildings in Hong Kong
1864 establishments in the British Empire